Intelsat 904 (or IS-904) is a communications satellite operated by Intelsat.

Launch 
Intelsat 904 was launched by an Ariane 4 rocket from Guiana Space Centre, Kourou, French Guiana, at 06:59 UTC on February 23, 2002.

Capacity and coverage 
The  satellite will provide television and internet services to Europe, Asia and Australia through its 76 C band and 22 Ku band transponders after parking over 60 degrees east longitude.

See also 
 2002 in spaceflight

External links 
 . Lyngsat
 . Intelsat

References 

Intelsat satellites
Communications satellites in geostationary orbit
Ariane commercial payloads
Spacecraft launched in 2002